Mission San José y San Miguel de Aguayo is an historic Catholic mission in San Antonio, Texas, United States. The mission was named in part for the Marquis de San Miguel de Aguayo, José de Azlor y Virto de Vera. Many buildings on the campus of Texas Tech University in Lubbock, Texas, borrow architectural elements from those found at Mission San José.

The mission was founded on February 23, 1720, because Mission San Antonio de Valero had become overcrowded shortly after its founding with refugees from the closed East Texas missions. Like San Antonio de Valero, Mission San José served the Coahuiltecan Natives. The first buildings, made of brush, straw, and mud, were quickly replaced by large stone structures, including guest rooms, offices, a dining room, and a pantry. A heavy outer wall was built around the main part of the mission, and rooms for 350 Natives were built into the walls.

A new church, which is still standing, was constructed in 1768 from local limestone.  The mission lands were given to its Natives in 1794, and mission activities officially ended in 1824.  After that, the buildings were home to soldiers, the homeless, and bandits. Starting in 1933, the Civil Works Administration and then the Works Progress Administration provided the labor to rebuild and restore the grounds of the mission. Some of the funding for the restoration came from money allotted by the United States for the Texas Centennial Exposition held in Dallas in 1936. The mission walls and Indian quarters were re-built, and the granary was restored.

The church facade features from the top: a cross, representing Jesus Christ, St. Joseph (San José) holding the infant Jesus, St. Dominic and St. Francis, Our Lady of Guadalupe (the Virgin Mary), and St. Joachim and St. Anne holding the infant Mary. Located at the south wall of the church sacristy is the Rose Window. Sculptor and significance of the Rose Window is unknown. According to folklore, the window was sculpted by a Spanish master craftsman and artist Pedro Huizar and dedicated it to his sweetheart Rosa who, on her way from Spain to meet with Pedro, lost her life at sea. The Rose Window was sculpted in 1775 and is an example of Baroque architecture in America.

Mission San José is now part of the San Antonio Missions National Historical Park. In 2015, along with The Alamo and Mission Concepción, it became one of five missions in San Antonio designated a World Heritage Site by the United Nations Education, Scientific and Cultural Organization.

Today the mission is an active parish, and is staffed by the Order of Friars Minor. The current pastor is Fr. Rogelio Martinez, OFM.

See also 
 Spanish missions in Texas
 Mission Nuestra Señora de la Purísima Concepción de Acuña; also Mission Concepcion
 Mission San Juan Capistrano
 Mission San Francisco de la Espada
 Espada Acequia
 Ethel Wilson Harris House

References

External links

 Mission San José y San Miguel de Aguayo at the National Park Service
 Mission San José y San Miguel de Aguayo at the Handbook of Texas Online

.

San Jose
San Antonio Missions National Historical Park
San Antonio Missions (World Heritage Site)
Buildings and structures in San Antonio
Churches completed in 1768
Archaeological sites in Texas
Tourist attractions in San Antonio
1720 establishments in Texas
1768 establishments in Texas
Spanish Colonial architecture in Texas
18th-century Roman Catholic church buildings in the United States